The Star Wars Archives are two hardcover books written by Paul Duncan and published by Taschen.

The Star Wars Archives 1977–1983 Episodes IV-XI weights 13 pounds. It contains 1,232 illustrations.

The Star Wars Archives 1999–2005 Episodes I-III includes plans George Lucas had for sequels.

The books included photographs from the sets of the Star Wars films.

Reception 
The Chicago Tribune states: “The Star Wars Archives pulls off the impossible: a fresh look at one of the most picked-off franchises ever.”

References 

Star Wars
Taschen books